The "Mind the Paint" Girl is a four-act play by Arthur Pinero, first published in 1912.

The play has a large cast of twenty eight named characters. The play was written to incorporate a song written by Jerome Kern. It premiered at the Duke of York's Theatre, London, in February 1912.

A film based on the play was made by director Wilfrid North in 1919, but it is considered lost.

References

External links

Plays by Arthur Wing Pinero
1912 plays
British plays adapted into films
West End plays